Richard Mallock (1843 – 28 June 1900) was a British Army officer and politician. Mallock served as a member of the House of Commons for Torquay from 1886 to 1895.

Early life and military career 
Mallock born in Cockington Court, Torquay. He studied at Harrow School and the Royal Military Academy in Woolwich. He then served as a lieutenant in the Royal Artillery from 1865 to 1876.

Post-military career 
After leaving service, he was a justice of the peace. At the 1885 UK general election, he stood unsuccessfully for the Conservative Party in Torquay, but he gained the seat in 1886, and held it until his retirement, in 1895.

Death 
In 1900, Mallock collapsed and died during a biking holiday to Scotland.

References

1843 births
1900 deaths
Conservative Party (UK) MPs for English constituencies
Members of the Parliament of the United Kingdom for constituencies in Devon
Politicians from Torquay
UK MPs 1886–1892
UK MPs 1892–1895
Military personnel from Torquay